Lawrence Paul Horwitz  (born October 14, 1930) is an American/Israeli physicist and mathematician who has made contributions in particle physics, statistical mechanics, mathematical physics, theory of unstable systems, classical chaos and quantum chaos, relativistic quantum mechanics, quantum field theory, general relativity, representations of quantum theory on hypercomplex Hilbert modules, group theory and functional analysis and stochastic theories of irreversible quantum evolution.

After obtaining his Ph.D. at Harvard University under Julian Schwinger, he worked at the IBM Research Laboratory in Yorktown, New York until 1964. He then worked at the Department of Theoretical Physics at the University of Geneva, Geneva, Switzerland, until 1966, and became full professor at the Department of Physics, University of Denver, Denver, Colorado.
  
He has been Full Professor at the School of Physics, Tel Aviv University since 1972 (Professor Emeritus since 1998), and teaching externally as well at Bar Ilan University from 1990. He has been participating as well in research at the Ariel University Center of Samaria.

He has been on the editorial and advisory boards and standing committees for several conferences on mathematical and theoretical physics and journals, and on the Panel of Assessors ARC, Australian National Funding DEET.

He has made frequent visits, long and short term, at the Institute for Advanced Study, Princeton, New Jersey, the Department of Theoretical Physics, University of Geneva, CERN (Geneva), University of Connecticut (Storrs, Connecticut), ETH (Honggerberg, Zurich), Institut des Hautes Etudes Scientifiques (Bures-sur-Yvette, France), and the Ilya Prigogine Center for Statistical Mechanics and Complex Systems, University of Texas at Austin, United States.

Research and achievements
He received the Samuel F.B. Morse Medal upon graduation (summa cum laude) from NYU, and was a member of Sigma Pi Sigma and Tau Beta Pi. He received a National Science Foundation Fellowship 52–53 and was a Shell Oil Fellow 56–57 at Harvard University. Three issues of Foundations of Physics were dedicated to him on the occasion of his 65 birthday [Foundations of Physics 26 (1996)1575–1739, 27(1997) 1–134, and 27(1997) 135–332].  He received an Outstanding Referee Award from the American Physical Society in 2008.

References

W. C. Schieve, For Lawrence Horwitz on his sixty-fifth birthday. Foundations of Physics, Volume 26 (1996), Number 12, pp. 1575–1578

External links
LAWRENCE P. HORWITZ, Personal web page, Tel-Aviv University
Scientific publications of Lawrence Paul Horwitz on INSPIRE-HEP

21st-century American physicists
20th-century American mathematicians
21st-century American mathematicians
1930 births
Living people
Harvard University alumni
University of Denver faculty
People associated with CERN
Mathematicians from New York (state)
Academic staff of Ariel University
Scientists from New York City